The 2004 Toronto Argonauts season was the 115th season for the professional Canadian football team since the franchise's inception in 1873. The team finished in second place in the East Division with a 10–7–1 record and qualified for the playoffs for the third consecutive year. The Argonauts defeated the Hamilton Tiger-Cats in the East Semi-Final and then won the Eastern Final against the Montreal Alouettes. Toronto faced the BC Lions in the 92nd Grey Cup and won their 15th Grey Cup championship by a score of 27–19.

Offseason

CFL draft

Preseason

Regular season

Season standings

Regular season

Postseason

Grey Cup

November 21 @ Frank Clair Stadium (Attendance: 51,242)

Toronto Argonauts (27) – TDs, Damon Allen (2), Robert Baker; FGs Noel Prefontaine (2); cons., Prefontaine (3).

BC Lions (19) – TDs, Jason Clermont, Dave Dickenson; FGs Duncan O'Mahony (2); cons. O'Mahony (1).

First Quarter 
BC—TD Clermont 12-yard pass from Dickenson (O'Mahony convert) 4:07 

Second Quarter 
TOR—FG Prefontaine 27-yard field goal 7:40 
TOR—TD Allen 1-yard run (Prefontaine convert) 12:22  
BC—FG O'Mahony 42-yard field goal 13:13 
TOR—TD Baker 23-yard pass from Allen (Prefontaine convert) 14:37 

Third Quarter 
TOR—TD Allen 1-yard run (Prefontaine convert) 4:45 
BC—FG O'Mahony 36-yard field goal 9:16 

Fourth Quarter 
BC—TD Dickenson 7-yard run (convert failed) 6:06 
TOR—FG Prefontaine 16-yard field goal 12:19

Awards and records

2004 CFL All-Stars
 Noel Prefontaine, P – CFL All-Star
 Noah Cantor, DT – CFL All-Star
 Kevin Eiben, LB – CFL All-Star
 Clifford Ivory, DB – CFL All-Star
 Orlondo Steinauer, DS – CFL All-Star

Eastern Division All-Star Selections
 Noel Prefontaine, K/P – CFL Eastern All-Star
 Bashir Levingston, ST – CFL Eastern All-Star
 Noah Cantor, DT – CFL Eastern All-Star
 Kevin Eiben, LB – CFL Eastern All-Star
 Clifford Ivory, DB – CFL Eastern All-Star
 Orlondo Steinauer, DS – CFL Eastern All-Star

References

Toronto Argonauts seasons
Grey Cup championship seasons
Toro